Montfortia emarginata, common name the emarginate limpet, is a species of sea snail, a marine gastropod mollusk in the family Fissurellidae, the keyhole limpets and slit limpets.

Description
The adult size of the shell varies between 20 mm and 40 mm.

Distribution
This species occurs in the following locations:
 Aruba
 Belize
 Bonaire
 Caribbean Sea
 Cayman Islands
 Colombia
 Cuba
 Curaçao
 Gulf of Mexico
 Jamaica
 Lesser Antilles
 Mexico
 Puerto Rico
 San Andrés

References

External links
 To World Register of Marine Species
 

Fissurellidae
Gastropods described in 1825